Victor Holt, Jr. (May 8, 1908 – April 22, 1988) was an American college basketball standout at Oklahoma in the late 1920s. He was an All-American and the Helms National Player of the Year in 1928. Holt was the University of Oklahoma's first national player of the year in men's basketball.

After college he played basketball in the Amateur Athletic Union (AAU) for Cook's Painter Boys, located in Kansas City, Missouri. With them he won two national championships in 1928 and 1929.

After basketball he worked for Goodyear Tire Company, ultimately became its 10th president, and also became an auto racing enthusiast & co-owner. He also is notable for having suggested the name of the famous auto-racing empire Dan Gurney's All American Racers, in which he was a partner/co-owner.

References

1908 births
1988 deaths
All-American college men's basketball players
Amateur Athletic Union men's basketball players
Basketball players from Oklahoma
Goodyear Tire and Rubber Company people
Oklahoma Sooners men's basketball players
Sportspeople from Palm Beach, Florida
Sportspeople from Oklahoma City
American men's basketball players
Centers (basketball)